The men's 49er was a sailing event on the Sailing at the 2012 Summer Olympics program in Weymouth and Portland National Sailing Academy. Sixteen races (last one a medal race) were scheduled and completed. 40 sailors, on 20 boats, from 20 nations competed. Ten boats qualified for the medal race on course area Nothe in front of Weymouth, where each position scored double points.

Schedule

Course areas and course configurations  

For the 49er course areas Portland, Nothe, and West were used. The location (50° 35.19’ N, 02° 26.54’ W) points to the center Portland course area, the location (50° 36.18’ N 02° 25.98’ W) points to the center of the Nothe course area and the location (50° 37.18’ N 02° 23.55’ W) points to the center of the West course area. The target time for the course was 30 minutes for the races as well as the medal race. The race management could choose from many course configurations.

Results

Daily standings

Further reading

References 

Men's 49er
49er (dinghy)